Skander Djamil Athmani (born 21 June 1992) Algerian Paralympic athlete. He made his maiden Paralympic appearance representing Algeria at the 2020 Summer Paralympics.

Career 
Skander initially competed in able-bodied competitions. He competed in the men's 100m, men's 4×100m relay and men's 4×400m relay events at the 2014 African Championships in Athletics. He was part of the men's 4×100m team which claimed bronze medal at the 2014 African Championships. He also represented Algeria at the 2017 Summer Universiade and competed in men's 100m, men's 200m, men's 4×400 relay events.

He took part in the men's 100m T13 event at the 2020 Summer Paralympics and claimed a silver medal in a thrilling final. He clocked 10.54 seconds as he finished just 0.01 seconds behind defending Paralympic champion and veteran para-athlete Jason Smyth of Ireland. Later in that tournament he participated in the men's 400m T13 event where he claimed a gold medal and set a new world record at 46.70 seconds, finishing one second ahead of Morocco's Mohamed Amguoun, who had held the previous world record.

References

External links 

 

1992 births
Living people
Algerian male sprinters
Paralympic silver medalists for Algeria
Athletes (track and field) at the 2020 Summer Paralympics
Paralympic athletes of Algeria
Paralympic medalists in athletics (track and field)
Medalists at the 2020 Summer Paralympics
Competitors at the 2017 Summer Universiade
Sportspeople from Constantine, Algeria
21st-century Algerian people